The Title & Trust Company of Florida Building is a historic site in Jacksonville, Florida. It is located at 200 East Forsyth Street. On February 23, 1990, it was added to the U.S. National Register of Historic Places.

References

External links
 Duval County listings at National Register of Historic Places
 Florida's Office of Cultural and Historical Programs
 Duval County listings
 Title & Trust Co. of Fl. Building

Office buildings in Jacksonville, Florida
Buildings and structures in Jacksonville, Florida
History of Jacksonville, Florida
National Register of Historic Places in Jacksonville, Florida
Northbank, Jacksonville